The PSL–PVL merger is the proposed merger of the Philippines' top-flight women's volleyball leagues, the Philippine Super Liga (PSL) and the Premier Volleyball League (PVL). The scheduling of both leagues has hampered the program of the Philippines national team and a merger of the two leagues has been proposed to remedy the issue. Two methods has been proposed; either through a "unified calendar" or adjustment of the two league's scheduling to deal with scheduling conflict, or an outright merger of the two leagues.

Background
The top women's volleyball leagues in the Philippines are the Philippine Super Liga (PSL) and the Premier Volleyball League (PVL). Scheduling of both leagues, accounting for both match days and training, has often clashed with each other causing player availability issues for the Philippine national team. An example of the two league affecting the national team program was in the 2019 Southeast Asian Games where the women's national team did not medal while the men's national team clinched a silver medal finish. The men's national team does not experience scheduling conflicts as the women's.

The two leagues has agreed in principle to initiate a merger of the two leagues as September 2019. However formal talks were suspended due to the COVID-19 pandemic.

There are at least two proposed methods on how a merger would be implemented. One is for the two leagues to come up with a "unified calendar", or a synchronized scheduling which would make all players competing in the two leagues available for the Philippine national league within a certain time window. This could be a prelude to an outright merger of the PSL and PVL into one unified league.

Unity Cup
As a lead up to a potential merger, the PSL and PVL plan to organize a tournament featuring sides from both leagues called the Unity Cup. Planning of the tournament started as early as December 2019. Planning for the tournament was stalled due to the Luzon enhanced community quarantine imposed in March 2020 due to the COVID-19 pandemic. Being discussed is the number of teams to participate. The PSL proposes a 16-team tournament with eight teams each from the two leagues participating while the PVL proposed a smaller 8-team tournament. Negotiations on the Unity Cup went into an impasse over disagreement over the proposed cup's number of teams.

See also
 ABA-NBA merger
 AFL-NFL merger
 WHA-NHL merger

References

Sports-related mergers
Volleyball in the Philippines
merger
merger